Heterocithara mediocris is a species of sea snail, a marine gastropod mollusk in the family Mangeliidae.

Description
The length of the shell attains 5.5 mm, its diameter 2.3 mm..

Distribution
This marine species is endemic to New Zealand and occurs off the North Island.

References

 Powell, A.W.B. 1979: New Zealand Mollusca: Marine, Land and Freshwater Shells, Collins, Auckland (p. 242)

External links
  Spencer H.G., Willan R.C., Marshall B.A. & Murray T.J. (2011). Checklist of the Recent Mollusca Recorded from the New Zealand Exclusive Economic Zone
 New Zealand Mollusca: Heterocithara mediocris

mediocris
Gastropods described in 1924
Gastropods of New Zealand